The 1977 World Table Tennis Championships men's doubles was the 34th edition of the men's doubles championship.

Li Chen-shih and Liang Ke-liang won the title after defeating Huang Liang and Lu Yuan-Sheng in the final by three sets to nil.

Results

See also
List of World Table Tennis Championships medalists

References

-